The 1995 Polish Speedway season was the 1995 season of motorcycle speedway in Poland.

Individual

Polish Individual Speedway Championship
The 1995 Individual Speedway Polish Championship final was held on 16 July at Wrocław. Tomasz Gollob won the Polish Championship for the fourth consecutive season.

Golden Helmet
The 1995 Golden Golden Helmet organised by the Polish Motor Union (PZM) was the 1995 event for the league's leading riders. The final was held at Wrocław on the 25 August. Tomasz Gollob continued to dominate Polish speedway by scoring a 15 point maximum and winning his third Golden Helmet in four years, in addition to his four successive Polish titles.

Junior Championship
 winner - Rafał Dobrucki

Silver Helmet
 winner - Rafał Dobrucki

Bronze Helmet
 winner - Rafał Dobrucki

Pairs

Polish Pairs Speedway Championship
The 1995 Polish Pairs Speedway Championship was the 1995 edition of the Polish Pairs Speedway Championship. The final was held on 6 September at Częstochowa.

Team

Team Speedway Polish Championship
The 1995 Team Speedway Polish Championship was the 1995 edition of the Team Polish Championship. WTS Wrocław won the gold medal for the third consecutive season. The team was once again led by the Dane Tommy Knudsen and he was strongly supported by Piotr Protasiewicz, Dariusz Śledź and Piotr Baron. Hans Nielsen topped the Polish averages with 2.772 for Polonia Piła.

First Division

Second Division

References

Poland Individual
Poland Team
Speedway
1995 in Polish speedway